Joseph Manuel Alves (born May 21, 1936) is an American film production designer, perhaps best known for his work on Close Encounters of the Third Kind and the first three films of the Jaws franchise. He directed the third installment Jaws 3-D.

Career
Alves has designed three features for Steven Spielberg, firstly for The Sugarland Express. He designed the three mechanical sharks for the movie Jaws (1975) with mechanical effects man Bob Mattey supervising their physical construction in Sun Valley CA. After the sharks were completed, they were trucked to the shooting location, but unfortunately they had not been tested in water causing a series of delays that have become quite legendary over time.

He was nominated for the Academy Award for Best Art Direction and won the BAFTA for Best Art Direction for his work on Close Encounters of the Third Kind.

Alves worked on Jaws 2 (1978) in the capacity of both production designer and as second unit director. After John D. Hancock, the initial director of Jaws 2, was sacked, it was suggested that Alves co-direct it with Verna Fields (who edited the original Jaws). Jeannot Szwarc was hired, however, to complete the film.

The model of New York he created for John Carpenter's Escape from New York (1981) has been described as "memorably derelict", and he was visual consultant on Carpenter's Starman (1984).

He directed Jaws 3-D (1983), which took advantage of the revival in popularity of 3-D at the time. The film received generally weak critical reception, with Variety criticising Alves for failing "to linger long enough on the Great White." He was nominated as 'worst director' in the 1983 Golden Raspberry Awards. Jaws 3-D was his only film as director.

Filmography

Film

Television (as art director)

References

External links

1936 births
Living people
American production designers
American film directors
Film directors from California
People from San Leandro, California
Best Production Design BAFTA Award winners
American people of Portuguese descent